USS Michigamme (AOG-64), was a type T1  built for the US Navy during World War II. She was named after the Michigamme River, in Michigan.

Construction
Michigamme was laid down on 30 December 1944, under a Maritime Commission (MARCOM) contract, MC hull 2625, by the St. Johns River Shipbuilding Company, Jacksonville, Florida; sponsored by Miss Elaine Jeanne Crouch; acquired by the US Navy and commissioned 10 August 1945.

Service history
Assigned to the Atlantic Fleet, Michigame with a Coast Guard crew reported to Commander, Service Force, 20 September 1945, for oiler duties off Norfolk, Virginia, until she decommissioned 23 January 1946. The next day she was delivered to the War Shipping Administration (WSA) to serve the Maritime Commission as Black Bayou. Before she could see service as Black Bayou she was sold to the Argentine Navy 22 March 1948, and commissioned in the Argentine Navy as Punta Ninfas (B‑15). She was sold for commercial service in 1958, and renamed Moises. She was sold for scrapping in 1964.

References

Bibliography

External links 
 Auke Visser's Famous T - Tankers Pages

 

Klickitat-class gasoline tankers
Ships built in Jacksonville, Florida
1945 ships
Ships transferred from the United States Navy to the Argentine Navy
James River Reserve Fleet